Athikkayam is a village located in the Pathanamthitta district of Kerala State, India. It is a small village that is situated on the bank of the Pamba River It's one of the 11 villages in Ranni taluk.

Climate

References 

Villages in Pathanamthitta district

Suburbs of Athikkayam 

 Kadumeenchira, Madanthamon, Chempanoli
 Kakkudumon,Kannampally, Ponnampara
 Adichipuzha, Mukkam, Naranammoozhy 

 Kudamurutty, Kochukulam, Thonikkadavu
 Perumthenaruvi, Kurumbanmoozhy
 Edamuri, Thombikanadom,